"Save a Kiss" is the fifth single by English singer-songwriter Jessie Ware off her fourth studio album, What's Your Pleasure? It was released 7 May 2020. It was written by Ware, James Ford, Shungudzo Kuyimbia and Danny Parker. Ford also produced the song.

Background
The song premiered on Annie Mac's BBC Radio 1 segment Hottest Record on 7 May 2020 as the fifth single off Ware's fourth studio album, What's Your Pleasure?. It was released during the COVID-19 pandemic and Ware explained that the song "has taken on a new meaning during these weird times and it seems like the right time to put it out. This track is an optimistic one for me, I hope it resonates with people wherever they are right now. It’s an upbeat song to dance along to and have fun with. I know I’ve got plenty of kisses I’m saving up for everyone when this is all over.”
Multiple critics compared the song to Robyn's 2018 studio album Honey.

Music video
On 8 May 2020, Ware announced on her Instagram account that there would be a music video accompanying the song. She asked fans to learn the choreography, by Olivier Casamayou, and win the chance to be in the video. Ware and the dancers filmed themselves individually at home because of the COVID-19 pandemic. Vicky Lawton directed the video, which was released on 26 May 2020.

Track listing
Digital download – Single Edit
"Save a Kiss" (Single Edit) - 3:38

Digital download – Totally Enormous Extinct Dinosaurs Remix
"Save a Kiss" (Totally Enormous Extinct Dinosaurs Remix) - 5:13

Digital download – PS1 Remix
"Save a Kiss" (PS1 Remix) - 3:05

Credits and personnel
Credits adapted from Tidal and YouTube.

 Jessie Ware – vocals, songwriter
 Danny Parker – songwriter, background vocals
 James Ford – producer, songwriter, mixer, recording engineer, programming, synthesizer, percussion, keyboards, guitar, bass guitar, drums
 Shungudzo Kuyimba – songwriter, background vocals
 Midland – producer, additional producer, synthesizer, programming
 Joe LaPorta – mastering engineer
 Jules Buckley – string arranger, horn arranger, conductor/piano
 Lewis Jones – recording engineer
 George Oulton – assistant recording engineer
 Tom Pigott-Smith – violin
 Lizzie Ball – violin
 Marianne Haynes – violin
 Laura Melhuish – violin
 Kate Robinson – violin
 Charlie Brown – violin
 Nicky Sweeney – violin
 Jeremy Isaac – violin
 Hannah Dawson – violin
 Oli Langford – violin
 Vicci Wardman – viola
 Helen Kamminga – viola
 Reiad Chibah – viola
 Ian Burdge – cello
 Chris Worsey – cello
 Katherine Jenkinson – cello
 Tom Walsh – trumpet, flugelhorn
 Louis Dowdeswell – trumpet, flugelhorn
 Andy Wood – trumpet, flugelhorn
 Callum Au – trombone
 Dave Stewart – bass trombone

Charts

References

Songs about kissing
2020 songs
2020 singles
Jessie Ware songs
British disco songs
Electropop songs
Songs written by Jessie Ware
Songs written by James Ford (musician)
Songs written by Danny Parker (songwriter)
Songs written by Shungudzo
Virgin EMI Records singles